Tanuj is an Indian masculine given name. Notable people with the name include:

Tanuj Virwani (born 1986), Indian actor and model
Tanuj Chopra, American filmmaker

See also
Tanuja (name)

Indian masculine given names